is a Japanese women's professional shogi player ranked 5-dan. She is a former Women's Meijin,  and  title holder. She is currently serving as a non-executive director for the Japan Shogi Association.

Women's shogi professional

Promotion history
Saida's  promotion history is as follows.
 Women's Professional Apprentice League: 1984
 3-kyū: April 1, 1986
 1-kyū: April 1, 1987
 1-dan: April 1, 1988
 2-dan: March 20, 1991
 3-dan: April 1, 1995
 4-dan: February 27, 2001
 5-dan: June 9, 2011

Note: All ranks are women's professional ranks.

Titles and other championships
Saida has appeared in major title matches twelve times and has won a total of four titles. In addition to major titles, Saida has won two other shogi championships.

Major titles

Other championships

Note: Tournaments marked with an asterisk (*) are no longer held or currently suspended.

Awards and honors
Saida received the Japan Shogi Association's "Women's Professional" Annual Shogi Award for the April 2000March 2001 shogi year. She received the JSA's "25 Years Service Award" in recognition of being an active professional for twenty-five years in 2010.

JSA director
At the Japan Shogi Association's 70th General Meeting held in June 2019, Saida was elected as a non-executive director to the association's board of directors. She was reelected to the same position in June 2021.

References

External links
 ShogiHub: Saida, Haruko

Japanese shogi players
Living people
People from Yokosuka, Kanagawa
Women's professional shogi players
Women's Meijin
Women's Ōshō
Kurashiki Tōka Cup
Professional shogi players from Kanagawa Prefecture
1966 births